Bujumbura, formerly Usumbura, is the economic capital, largest city and main port of Burundi. It ships most of the country's chief export, coffee, as well as cotton and tin ore. Bujumbura was formerly the country's normal capital. In late December 2018, Burundian president Pierre Nkurunziza announced that he would follow through on a 2007 promise to return Gitega its former political capital status, with Bujumbura remaining as economical capital and center of commerce. A vote in the Parliament of Burundi made the change official on 16 January 2019, with all branches of government expected to move to Gitega within three years.

History

Bujumbura grew from a small village after it became a military post in German East Africa in 1889. After World War I it was made the administrative center of the Belgian League of Nations mandate of Ruanda-Urundi. The name was changed from Usumbura to Bujumbura when Burundi became independent in 1962. Since independence, Bujumbura has been the scene of frequent fighting between the country's two main ethnic groups, with Hutu militias opposing the Tutsi-dominated Burundi army.

Geography

Bujumbura is on the north-eastern shore of Lake Tanganyika, the second deepest lake in the world after Lake Baikal. The city also lies at the mouth of the Ruzizi River and two smaller rivers (Muha and Ntahangwa).

Climate
Bujumbura features a tropical savanna climate (Köppen: Aw) bordering on a hot semi-arid climate (BSh). There are distinct wet and dry seasons. Its wet season is from October to April, while the dry season covers the remaining five months. Despite being located close to the equator, Bujumbura is not as hot as one might expect, due to its altitude.

Administration

Bujumbura is governed by a community council and community administrator. It is further divided into three communes, or neighborhoods, each with its own council and council leader.

Each of the three current communes were created from the 13 former communes (currently sub-communes), due to a 2014 reorganization, which in turn are further sub-divided into villages or zones:

 Commune of Muha
 Kanyosha
 Quarters: Gisyo-Nyabaranda, Gisyo, Musama I, Musama II, Musama III, Musama IV, Musama V, Nyabugete, Kizingwe-Bihara, Nkenga-Busoro, Ruziba, Kajiji
 Kinindo
 Quarters: Kibenga, Kinanira I, Kinanira II, Kinanira III, Kinanira IV, Kinindo, Zeimet-OUA
 
 Quarters: Gasekebuye-Gikoto, Gitaramuka, Kamesa, Kinanira I, Kinanira II
 Commune of Mukaza
 Buyenzi
 Quarters: I, II, III, IV, V, VI, VII
 
 Quarters: Bwiza I, Bwiza II, Bwiza III, Bwiza IV, Kwijabe I, Kwijabe II, Kwijabe III
 
 Quarters: Kigwati, Nyakabiga I, Nyakabiga II, Nyakabiga III
 
 Quarters: Centre Ville, Rohero I - Gatoke, Kabondo, Mutanga-Sud - Sororezo, Asiatique, I.N.S.S, Rohero II, Kiriri-Vugizo
 Commune of Ntahangwa
 Buterere
 Quarters: Buterere I, Buterere II A, Buterere II B, Kabusa, Kiyange, Maramvya, Mubone, Mugaruro, Kiyange
 
 Quarters: I, II, III, IV, V, VI, VII
 Gihosha
 Quarters: Gasenyi, Gihosha, Gikungu, Kigobe, Mutanga-Nord, Muyaga, Nyabagere, Taba, Winterekwa
 
 Quarters: Gikizi, Gituro, Heha, Kavumu, Mirango I, Mirango II, Songa, Teza, Twinyoni
 Kigobe
 Quarters: Kigobe Nord, Kigobe Sud
 Kinama
 Quarters: Bubanza, Buhinyuza, Bukirasazi I, Bukirasazi II, Bururi, Carama, Gitega, Kanga, Muramvya, Muyinga, Ngozi, Ruyigi, SOCARTI.
 
 Quarters: I, II, III, IV, V, VI, VII, VIII, IX, Industriel

Economy

Bujumbura's central market is in the City Centre, along Rwagasore Avenue. During the 1993 ethnic violence in Burundi, citizens had become less likely to travel far from the City Centre, and markets in neighbouring communities lost their business to the central market in Bujumbura. Consequently, vendors moved their business to the central market, many settling outside the market due to lack of space. However, the central market houses the largest variety of merchandise in the city, with stores that sell a wide range of goods.

At dawn of 27 January 2013 a serious fire ravaged Bujumbura's central market. Due to poor emergency response, the fire lasted for hours, resulting in a serious blow to local exchanges. Hundreds of vendors, local and foreign, lost their goods to the fire and the reported looting. While Burundi's emergency services were unable to extinguish the blaze on their own, neighbouring Rwanda sent helicopters to assist in the emergency response.

Politics
List of mayors of Bujumbura
 Gérard Kibinakanwa, 1962–1967
 Thérence Ndikumasabo, 1967–1969
 Pie Kanyoni, 1969–1975 and 1976–1977
 Charles Kabunyoma, 1976
 Juvénal Madirisha, 1977–1979
 Germain Nkwirikiye, 1979–1981
 Lucien Sakubu, 1981–1987
 Léonidas Ndoricimpa, 1987–1991
 Arthémon Mvuyekure, 1991–1992
 Anatole Kanyenkiko, 1992–1993
 Léonce Sinzinkayo, 1993–1994
 Pie Ntiyankundiye, 1994–2002
 Pontien Niyongabo, 2002–2005
 Célestin Sebutama, 2005–2007
 Elias Buregure, 2007
 Evrard Giswaswa, circa 2008–2012
 Saidi Juma, circa 2012
 Freddy Mbonimpa, 2017–2020
 Jimmy Hatungimana, 2020–

Sports
Bujumbura is the location for the city's multisport Intwari stadium. Mainly used for football games, it is the country's largest stadium with 22,000 seats.

The city is also home to multiple basketball and tennis courts, as well as a multitude of indoor and outdoor swimming pools.

Education 

The University of Burundi is in Bujumbura, as are Hope Africa University, Université Paix et Réconciliation, Université des Grands Lacs, Université du Lac Tanganyika, Ecole Normale Supérieure, Université Lumière de Bujumbura, Bujumbura International University (BIU), International University of Equator, International Leadership University of Bujumbura, Université Ntare Rugamba of Bujumbura, Université Sagesse d'Afrique de Bujumbura, Université Martin Luther King, Institut Supérieur de Développement de Bujumbura (ISD), Ecole Nationale d'Administration "ENA", Institut National de Santé Publique "INSP", Institut Supérieur de Gestion des Entreprises "ISGE", Institut Supérieur d'Ingénieurs et Cadres Techniciens en Génie Informatique, Télécommunications et Technologies Avancées "INITELEMATIQUE".

International schools:
 École Belge de Bujumbura (Belgian school)
 École Française de Bujumbura (French school)
 King's School (British school)
 Bujumbura International Montessori School
 Burundi English School  (English Language School)
Cubahiro International School

Transport

The Bujumbura International Airport is situated on the outskirts of the city.

Public transport in Bujumbura mainly consists of taxis and mini-buses, locally known as the Hiace. Public transport vehicles are generally white and blue.

Bujumbura's taxis are abundant all over the city, and are considered the safest form of transportation. There are taxi-motos (motorcycle taxis) and taxis-vélos (bicycle taxis), although they are only available in certain parts of the city.

For long-distance travel, locals prefer to take the many Hiace full-size vans, which travel regularly across Burundi. Bujumbura's main bus terminal is located by the Central Market.

Health
Bujumbura is also home to many clinics and the province's main hospitals: the Prince Regent Charles Hospital, the Roi Khaled Hospital, and the Military Hospital.

Places of worship    

Among the places of worship are predominantly Christian churches and temples: Roman Catholic Archdiocese of Bujumbura (Catholic Church), Province of the Anglican Church of Burundi (Anglican Communion), Union of Baptist Churches in Burundi (Baptist World Alliance), and Assemblies of God. There are also Muslim mosques.

Culture
Bujumbura's main attractions are its many museums, parks and monuments. Museums in the city include the Burundi Museum of Life and the Burundi Geological Museum. Other nearby attractions are the Rusizi National Park, the Livingstone-Stanley Monument at Mugere (where David Livingstone and Henry Morton Stanley visited 14 days after their first historic meeting at Ujiji in Tanzania), the presidential palace and the source of the southernmost tributary of the Nile, described locally as the source of the Nile.

Bujumbura was also home of the independent weekly radio programme Imagine Burundi, the country's first locally produced English-language programme that focused on stories about life in the region. The show was broadcast from September 2010 to August 2013, and recordings are archived on the show's website at imagineburundi.com.

Demographics 
Bujumbura is projected to be the fourth fastest growing African continent city between 2020 and 2025, with a 5.75% growth.

International relations

Bujumbura is twinned with:
 Ubon Ratchathani, Thailand
 Corigliano Calabro, Italy

References

Bibliography

External links

Official Website of Bujumbura
Map of Bujumbura
Official Website of the Ministry of Justice of Burundi
Lonely Planet guide

 
Cities in the Great Rift Valley
Lake Tanganyika
Populated places in Burundi
Populated places established in 1871
1871 establishments in Africa
Former national capitals